Tamara Popova was a Soviet sprint canoer who competed in the early 1970s. She won two medals at the ICF Canoe Sprint World Championships with a gold (K-4 500 m: 1973) and a bronze (K-2 500 m: 1971).

References

Living people
Soviet female canoeists
Year of birth missing (living people)
Russian female canoeists
ICF Canoe Sprint World Championships medalists in kayak